Big Beat from Badsville is the seventh studio album by the American rock band the Cramps. It was released in 1997 on Epitaph Records. 

The album was recorded and mixed at engineer Earle Mankey's house in Thousand Oaks, California, in May 1997. It was produced by Poison Ivy and Lux Interior. It is the only Cramps album to consist solely of original songs.

The Cramps reissued the album on their own record label, Vengeance Records, in 2001 with four bonus tracks: "Confessions of a Psycho Cat", "No Club Lone Wolf", "I Walked All Night" and "Peter Gunn".

Track listing

Personnel 
The Cramps
 Lux Interior - vocals
 Poison Ivy Rorschach - guitars, theremin
 Slim Chance - bass guitar
 Harry Drumdini - drums
Technical
Earle Mankey - engineer
Nick Rubenstein, The Cramps - art direction
Lux Interior - front cover photography

Notes and references 

1997 albums
The Cramps albums